The coarse chameleon (Trioceros rudis), also known as the rudis chameleon, Ruwenzori side-striped chameleon or the Rwenzori bearded chameleon, is a chameleon from western Uganda, Rwanda, Burundi, and eastern DR Congo. Contrary to common belief, this species does not inhabit Mount Meru, Tanzania. Tanzania chameleons called T. rudis are in fact T. sternfeldi.

This chameleon is often found in open habitats, inhabiting low bushes and shrubs (often described as 'patchy open country") in the transitional zones between grasslands, reedbeds and montane heath.

T. rudis is small and lacks horns or occipital lobes. It has a long tail and a small crest.

References

External links

 
 Chamaeleo Research Group [Japanese]

Trioceros
Endangered animals
Vertebrates of Burundi
Reptiles of the Democratic Republic of the Congo
Vertebrates of Rwanda
Reptiles of Uganda
Lizards of Africa
Reptiles described in 1906
Taxa named by George Albert Boulenger